Aphelodoris is a genus of sea slugs, a dorid nudibranch, a shell-less marine gastropod mollusc in the family Dorididae.

Species
There are 10 species in the genus Aphelodoris.

Aphelodoris antillensis Bergh, 1879
Aphelodoris berghi Odhner, 1924
Aphelodoris brunnea Bergh, 1907
Aphelodoris gigas Wilson, 2003
Aphelodoris greeni Burn, 1966
Aphelodoris karpa Wilson, 2003
Aphelodoris lawsae Burn, 1966
Aphelodoris luctuosa (Cheeseman, 1882)
Aphelodoris rossquicki Burn, 1966
Aphelodoris varia (Abraham, 1877)

References

External links

Dorididae
Gastropod genera